Lado is a small settlement in Central Equatoria in South Sudan, on the west bank of the White Nile. It is situated north of the modern-day city of Juba.

When General Gordon was appointed governor of the Egyptian territory of Equatoria in 1874, he moved his capital from Gondokoro to Lado, which had a healthier climate.
In 1878 Emin Pasha was appointed Bey of Equatoria, then nominally under Egyptian control, with his base at Lado.
At one point the settlement was capital of the Lado Enclave. Travelling through Africa, Russian explorer Wilhelm Junker stayed in Lado in 1884, and wrote complimentarily of its brick buildings and neat streets.

References

Sources
 Middleton, J. (1971) "Colonial rule among the Lugbara" in Colonialism in Africa, 1870-1960, vol. 3., (ed. Turner, V.), Cambridge University Press: Cambridge. .

Populated places in Central Equatoria
Lado Enclave